The 2022 World Cup of Pool will be a professional pool doubles tournament, and the 15th edition of the World Cup of Pool. The event will be contested by 32 pairs representing different nations, and will take place at the Brentwood Centre in Brentwood, England, from 14 to 19 June 2022.

The German team of Joshua Filler and Thorsten Hohmann were defending their 2021 title, but were knocked out in the second round to the Dutch pairing of Niels Feijen and Marc Bijsterbosch.

Prize fund
The total prize money for the event:
Winners (per pair): $60,000
Runners-up (per pair): $30,000
Semi-finalists (per pair): $15,000
Quarter-finalists (per pair): $9,000	
Last 16 losers (per pair): $4,500
Last 32 losers (per pair): $3,625

Teams
Each competing nation features two players, with the hosts, Great Britain, receiving two places. The Filipino pairing of Efren Reyes and Carlo Biado were replaced by Thailand due to travel issues.

The competing teams were made of the players below:

Tournament bracket
Source:

References

External links

2022
2022 in English sport
June 2022 sports events in the United Kingdom
2022 in cue sports
Brentwood (Essex town)